African Junior Records in the sport of athletics are ratified by the Confederation of African Athletics (CAA). Athletics records comprise the best performance of an athlete before the year of their 20th birthday.  Technically, in all under 20 age divisions, the age is calculated "on December 31 of the year of competition" to avoid age group switching during a competitive season. CAA doesn't maintain an official list for indoor performances. All bests shown on the indoor list are tracked by statisticians not officially sanctioned by the governing body.

Outdoor
Key to tables:

+ = en route to a longer distance

A = affected by altitude

a = automatic timing

h = hand timing

Men

Women

Mixed

Indoor

Men

Women

Notes

References
General
CAA: African U20 records – Outdoor. 8 March 2022 updated
Specific

External links
 CAA web site

junior
African